The International Journal of Rural Management is the first International Journal that focuses exclusively on rural management as opposed to rural or community or sustainable development. It is a platform for discussion on the practical dimensions of organising and managing rural enterprises and community based organisations.

The Journal is published by SAGE Publications, India in Association with the Institute of Rural Management Anand.

The journal is a member of the Committee on Publication Ethics (COPE).

Abstracting and indexing 
International Journal of Rural Management is abstracted and indexed in:
 ProQuest: International Bibliography of the Social Sciences (IBSS)
 SCOPUS
 DeepDyve
 Portico
 Dutch-KB
 Pro-Quest-RSP
 EBSCO
 OCLC
 Ohio
 ICI
 ProQuest-Illustrata
 J-Gate

External links 
 
 Homepage

References 

 COPE

SAGE Publishing academic journals
Publications established in 2014
Human resource management publications
Business and management journals
Biannual journals